The 1995–96 Azadegan League was the fifth season of the Azadegan League that was won by Persepolis. The following is the final results of the Azadegan League's 1995–96 football season.

Mohammad Momeni (Poli Ekril Isfahan) was the top goal scorer with 19 goals.

League table

 Iranian football champions: Persepolis
 Relegated: Jonoob Ahvaz, Ararat Tehran, Shahrdari Tabriz, Saipa
 Promoted: Zob Ahan, Payam Mashhad, Teraktor Sazi, Sanat Naft

Azadegan League seasons
Iran
1995–96 in Iranian football